The 1979 Argentine Grand Prix was a Formula One motor race held on 21 January 1979 at the Autódromo Municipal Ciudad de Buenos Aires. The race had to be restarted because there was a huge crash at the second of the very fast esses after the pit straight that took off a number of drivers, including Jody Scheckter, Nelson Piquet, John Watson, Patrick Tambay and Mario Andretti.

Classification

Qualifying classification

Race classification

Championship standings after the race

Drivers' Championship standings

Constructors' Championship standings

Note: Only the top five positions are included for both sets of standings.

References

Argentine Grand Prix
Argentine Grand Prix
Grand Prix
Argentine Grand Prix